Rear Admiral Henry Priaulx Cayley (29 December 1877 – 31 December 1942) was a British Royal Navy officer who transferred to the Royal Australian Navy in 1912, rising to flag rank.

References

External links
http://dreadnoughtproject.org/tfs/index.php/Henry_Priaulx_Cayley

1877 births
1942 deaths
Australian military personnel of World War I
Henry Priaulx
Royal Navy officers
Royal Navy personnel of the Boxer Rebellion
Royal Australian Navy admirals